This is a list of college football bowl games, including those proposed and defunct. Three bowl games are part of the College Football Playoff, a selection system that creates bowl matchups involving four of the top-ranked teams in the NCAA Division I Football Bowl Subdivision (FBS). There are also a number of other college football postseason invitationals, as well as several all-star games.

For nearly a century, bowl games were the purview of only the very best teams, but a steady proliferation of new bowl games required more teams, with 70 participating teams by the 2010–11 bowl season, then 80 participating teams by the 2015–16 bowl season.  As a result, the NCAA has steadily relaxed the criteria for bowl eligibility. Teams with a non-winning record (6–6) were allowed starting in 2010. Requirements were further reduced to allow teams with outright losing records (5–7) to be invited since 2012, with the team with the best Academic Progress Rate score (among teams with 5–7 records) to be chosen first. While inviting teams without winning records to bowl games has become more commonplace, there were several losing teams who played in bowl games before the last decade's changes in bowl eligibility: 1946 Gator Bowl, South Carolina (2–3–3); 1963 Sun Bowl, SMU (4–6); 1970 Tangerine Bowl, William & Mary (5–6); and the 2001 New Orleans Bowl, North Texas (5–6). For the 2016–17 bowl season, 25% of the bowl participants (20 teams) did not have a winning record.

The tables (College Football Playoff games, Other current Division I FBS bowl games) reflect changes for the 2022–23 bowl season.

Bowl games are not limited to the Bowl Subdivision; teams in the three lower divisions of the NCAA—the Football Championship Subdivision (FCS), Division II, and Division III—are also allowed to participate in bowl games. The playoff structure in those three divisions discourages most high-caliber teams from participating in bowl games, as teams would rather contest for their division's national championship than play in a bowl game. The same basic guidelines for bowl eligibility apply for those contests. As of 2017, one bowl game (the Celebration Bowl) exists for FCS, four bowls serve Division II, and ten exist for teams in Division III (not including the Stagg Bowl, which is the name for the NCAA Division III Football Championship game).

Community college bowl games, not sanctioned by the NCAA, are also listed.

College Football Playoff games

Six major bowl games, known as the New Year's Six, rotate the hosting of the two semifinal games which determine the teams that play in the final College Football Playoff National Championship game. The New Year's Six includes six of the ten oldest bowl games (missing the Sun, Gator, Citrus and Liberty bowls), continuing their original history of pitting the very best teams in the country against each other.  These six games focus on the top 12 teams in the rankings, with only five teams ranked lower than 12th (all five were still ranked in the top 20) having ever played in the New Year's Six since the College Football Playoff system was inaugurated.

^ The Rose Bowl did not add a sponsor to its name until the 1998 season.  Unlike other bowls, which give the sponsor's name precedence ahead of the bowl's name (effectively changing the title of the game), the Rose Bowl adds the sponsor as "presented by", after the words Rose Bowl.
* Two-time move due to World War II travel restrictions after the attack on Pearl Harbor as well as the COVID-19 pandemic moving the 2021 game to AT&T Stadium in Arlington, TX.
† One-time move due to damage to the Superdome from Hurricane Katrina.

Other current Division I FBS bowl games
Besides the six bowl games that are part of the College Football Playoff, there are a number of other postseason invitationals. Generally, two conferences will agree to send teams of a particular standing to a game beforehand. For instance, the Rose Bowl traditionally features the Big Ten and Pac-12 conference champions. Generally, the payout to the participating teams in a bowl game is closely correlated to its prestige. By comparison, each of the former BCS bowls (including the national championship game) had a payout of $18 million.

Non-FBS bowl games

Division I FCS bowls

Division II bowls
NOTE:  These games are similar to the National Invitation Tournament in Division I college basketball, for teams in conferences that did not make the NCAA Division II tournament.

Division III bowls

Additionally, NCAA Division III is home to the Amos Alonzo Stagg Bowl (1973–2019; was played in Salem, Virginia). NCAA awarded the 2020 & 2021 games to Canton, OH, 2022 game to Navy-Marine Corp Stadium, 2023 to Salem VA, 2024 game to Humble TX and finally the 2025 game back to Canton. In contrast to other bowl games, the Stagg Bowl operates within the NCAA tournament structure rather than as a stand-alone post-season game; it serves as the Division III national championship game to conclude a 32-team post-season playoff.

NAIA bowl games

The NAIA's national championship game (which is the conclusion of a 16 team playoff) is currently not named as a bowl, but has held a bowl name in the past. Additionally, from 1970 to 1996, NAIA football was split into two divisions and held a separate tournaments and championships for both divisions; the Division II championship was never named a bowl and as such the past names listed below do not apply to the Division II championship game.

NCCAA bowl games
Football teams that are a part of the NCCAA may also be members of the NCAA, NAIA, or of neither. Bids to the Victory Bowl are given to NCCAA teams that did not make the NCAA or NAIA playoffs and is treated as the NCCAA Championship Game, but follows no playoff itself.

Proposed games
The number of bowl games have risen steadily, reaching 41 (including the national championship game) by the 2015 bowl season.  To fill the 80 available bowl slots, a record 15 teams with non-winning seasons participated in bowl games—including three with a record of 5–7. This situation led directly to the NCAA Division I Council imposing a three-year moratorium on new bowl games in April 2016.

Since 2010, organizers and boosters have continued to propose other bowl games—some of these proposals have since been dropped, while others are active proposals that have been placed on hold during the NCAA moratorium.

Two proposed games, the Cure Bowl and Christmas Bowl, were turned down by the NCAA for 2010.  The Cure Bowl was eventually added in 2014, for the 2015 bowl season.

In August 2013, the Detroit Lions announced that it would hold a new bowl game at Ford Field beginning in 2014, holding Big Ten and Atlantic Coast Conference tie-ins, despite the existence of the Little Caesars Pizza Bowl. While Pizza Bowl organizers attempted to move the game to Comerica Park (a baseball stadium across the street from Ford Field), these plans never came to fruition. In August 2014, the Lions announced that the new game would be known as the Quick Lane Bowl, and play its inaugural game on December 26, 2014. In a statement to Crain's Detroit Business, Motor City Bowl co-founder Ken Hoffman confirmed that there would be no Little Caesars Pizza Bowl for 2014.

In June 2013, ESPN.com reported that the so-called "Group of Five" conferences—the American Athletic Conference, Conference USA, MAC, Mountain West Conference, and Sun Belt Conference—were considering adding one or more new bowl games once the NCAA's current moratorium on new bowls expires after the 2013 season. This move was driven by a trend for the "Power Five" conferences (ACC, Big Ten, Big 12, Pac-12, and SEC) to play one another in bowl games. The 2013 season, the last of the current four-year bowl cycle, will have 16 bowls that involve two teams from "Power Five" leagues. The 2014 season, the first of a new six-year bowl cycle, will have at least 19, and possibly more, matchups of "Power Five" teams. The "Group of Five" was apparently concerned that this trend would mean that its teams might not have available bowl slots.

According to reports, the 2010 Christmas Bowl proposal would have involved a Mountain West team against an opponent from either the Pac-12 or The American. As for The American, it has suggested a new bowl game, most likely at Marlins Park in Miami. Two other venues of "Group of Five" schools in Florida—Spectrum Stadium (UCF, Orlando) and FAU Stadium (Florida Atlantic, Boca Raton)—are being considered for other potential bowls. A possible bowl in Little Rock would pit C-USA and the Sun Belt. Finally, the director of the current Little Caesars Bowl indicated that he had been in contact with officials from all of the "Group of Five" about starting new bowl games in Ireland (most likely Dublin), Dubai, and either Toronto or Nassau.  Recently, though, reports have indicated the proposed games in Ireland and Dubai would be unworkable.

The first new bowl to be confirmed for 2014 was the Camellia Bowl, a game created by ESPN and played in Montgomery, Alabama. It secured tie-ins with the MAC and Sun Belt, and an initial contract to run through the 2019 season. ESPN was also reported to be in negotiations to take over ownership of the existing Heart of Dallas Bowl and establish a new bowl game in Boca Raton.

Another ownership group interested in starting a Montgomery-based bowl at New ASU Stadium reportedly switched focus to Charleston, South Carolina.  In the face of obstacles related to an NCAA ban on playing postseason games at predetermined locations in South Carolina due to the Confederate battle flag being flown at a civil war monument on the State House grounds, the ownership group instead chose to stage the Medal of Honor Bowl all-star game at Johnson Hagood Stadium beginning in 2014.  However, with the Confederate flag's removal from the State House grounds on July 10, 2015, the NCAA lifted its ban that day.  As such, on August 27 of that year, the Medal of Honor Bowl announced their plans to become a traditional postseason bowl game beginning on December 18, 2016, pending NCAA approval. The all-star game format was not played that year as a result. However, in April 2016, the NCAA announced a moratorium on new bowl games; organizers had subsequently announced plans to hold the bowl (as an all-star game again) in January 2018; however, no further editions of the Medal of Honor Bowl have been played.

Map of bowl games

Number of current FBS bowl games by state
Includes bowls with their 2021 editions cancelled

* Bowl is a College Football Playoff semifinal, once every three seasons, in rotation under current CFP format

Outside U.S.

All-Star games

FBS all-star games
All-star games predominantly featuring players from the FBS-level (or historical equivalents, such as Division I-A).

Other all-star games

Regular season rivalries called bowls
Empire State Bowl – Columbia and Cornell
Shula Bowl – FIU and Florida Atlantic
Black and Blue Bowl – Memphis and Southern Miss
Crab Bowl Classic – Maryland and Navy
Egg Bowl – Ole Miss and Mississippi State
Iron Bowl – Alabama and Auburn
Magnolia Bowl – LSU and Ole Miss
Palmetto Bowl – Clemson and South Carolina
Textile Bowl – Clemson and North Carolina State
Safeway Bowl – North Texas and SMU

Bowl games played outside of the US
Aztec Bowl – Mexico (1950–53, 1955, 1957, 1964–66, 1970–71, 1971–80, 1984, 1986–present)
Bacardi Bowl – seven exhibition games played in Havana, Cuba, from 1907 to 1946
International Bowl – bowl game played in Toronto, Canada, from 2007 to 2010
Bahamas Bowl – currently played bowl game in Nassau, Bahamas, since 2014.

Junior college bowl games
 C.H.A.M.P.S. Heart of Texas Bowl – Copperas Cove, Texas
 The Graphic Edge Bowl – Cedar Falls, Iowa (formerly Coca-Cola Bowl, Like Cola Bowl, Royal Crown Bowl, Pepsi-Cola/Sigler Printing Bowl). This bowl is a doubleheader with the Iowa runner-up playing in the first game and the Iowa champion in the second. The opponents for each game are chosen at-large.
 Mississippi Bowl – Biloxi, Mississippi
 Midwest Classic Bowl – Miami, Oklahoma
 Red Grange Bowl – Glen Ellyn, Illinois
 Salt City Bowl – Hutchinson, Kansas

Defunct

 Beef Empire Classic – Garden City, Kansas
 Brazos Valley Bowl – Bryan, Texas
 Carrier Dome Bowl – Syracuse, New York
 Citizens Bank Bowl – Pittsburg, Kansas. Known in its last season as the Football Capital of Kansas Bowl. Hosted 2009 National Junior College Athletic Association National Championship game between Blinn and Fort Scott, which featured future NFL stars Cam Newton and Lavonte David.
 Dalton Defenders Bowl – Coffeyville, Kansas
 Dixie Rotary Bowl – St. George, Utah
 East Bowl – rotating site among Coastal Conference schools
 El Toro Bowl – Yuma, Arizona
 Empire State Bowl – Uniondale, New York
 Garland Texas Bowl – Garland, Texas
 Golden Isles Bowl – Brunswick, Georgia
 Grenn Country Bowl – Tahlequah, Oklahoma
 Junior Rose Bowl – Pasadena, California
 Kansas Jayhawk Bowl Classic – Coffeyville, Kansas
 Mid-America Bowl – Tulsa, Oklahoma
 Midwest Bowl – rotating site among North Central Community College Conference schools
 Mineral Water Bowl – Excelsior Springs, Missouri
 Mississippi Magnolia Bowl – MACJC Championship game, rotating site
 North Star Bowl – Rochester, Minnesota
 Pilgrim's Pride Bowl – Mt. Pleasant, Texas
 Real Dairy Bowl – Pocatello, Idaho
 Red River Bowl – Bedford, Texas
 Roaring Ranger Bowl – Ranger, Texas
 Robert A. Bothman Bulldog Bowl – San Mateo, California
 Rodeo Bowl – Arkansas City, Kansas
 Sterling Silver Bowl – Sterling, Kansas
 Texas Shrine Bowl – Tyler, Texas
 Top of the Mountain Bowl – Sandy, Utah
 Valley of the Sun Bowl – rotating site in Maricopa County, Arizona
 Wool Bowl – Roswell, New Mexico

Source: NJCAA

Defunct bowl games

Defunct major-college bowl games

Defunct Division I-AA bowl games
Camellia Bowl – Sacramento, California (1980)
Heritage Bowl – Atlanta, Georgia (1991–1999)
Pioneer Bowl – Wichita Falls, Texas (1978, 1981–1982)
Gridiron Classic – rotating locations (2006–2009)
ECAC Bowl – rotating locations (1993–2003)

Defunct Division II bowl games
Boardwalk Bowl – Atlantic City, New Jersey (1973)
Camellia Bowl – Sacramento, California (1973–1975)
Dixie Rotary Bowl – Saint George, Utah (2006–2008)
Grantland Rice Bowl – Murfreesboro, Tennessee & Baton Rouge, Louisiana (1973–1977)
Heart of Texas Bowl – Copperas Cove, Texas & Waco, Texas (2012-2018)  
Kanza Bowl – Topeka, Kansas (2009–2012)
Knute Rockne Bowl – Akron, Ohio & Davis, California (1976–1977)
Pioneer Bowl – various locations (1973–1977, 1997–2012)

Defunct Division III bowl games

Oyster Bowl – Norfolk, Virginia (at various times in its history a Division I bowl game, a Division III bowl game and, currently, a regular season game)
ECAC Presidents Bowl - New Britain, Connecticut (2015) and Philadelphia, Pennsylvania (2016)
ECAC Legacy Bowl - New Britain, Connecticut (2015) and Philadelphia, Pennsylvania (2016)

Defunct regular-season games known as bowl games

Defunct minor-college or unofficial bowl games

See also
Automatic bids to college bowl games

References

Further reading